The 1977 San Jose State Spartans football team represented San Jose State University during the 1977 NCAA Division I football season as a member of the Pacific Coast Athletic Association. The team was led by second year head coach Lynn Stiles. They played home games at Spartan Stadium in San Jose, California. The Spartans finished the season with a record of four wins and seven losses (4–7, 2–2 PCAA).

Schedule

Team players in the NFL
The following were selected in the 1978 NFL Draft.

The following finished their San Jose State career in 1977, were not drafted, but played in the NFL.

Notes

References

San Jose State
San Jose State Spartans football seasons
San Jose State Spartans football